Two ships of the United States Navy have borne the name USS Carrabasset, in honor of the Carrabassett River, a stream in Franklin County and Somerset Counties, Maine.

 , was a side-wheel steamer, which was purchased and commissioned in 1864. Carrabasset was decommissioned and sold in 1865.
 , was a tugboat launched in 1919. She was decommissioned in 1922 and transferred to the Treasury Department, for use by the Coast Guard in 1924.

United States Navy ship names